Kasper Klitgaard (born 24 March 1979) is a Danish handballer, currently playing for Danish Handball League side Nordsjælland Håndbold.

Klitgaard is noted for 3 appearances on the Danish national handball team.

External links
  player info

1979 births
Living people
Danish male handball players